E. terrestris may refer to:
 Ettlia terrestris, a synonym of the alga species Chlororustica terrestris, the only species in the genus Chlororustica
 Euophrys terrestris, a jumping spider species
 Euptychia terrestris, a butterfly species